Kenneth Webb may refer to:
 Kenneth Webb (director)
 Kenneth Webb (artist)
 Kenneth Webb (cricketer)
 Ken Webb, English cyclist